Bravski Vaganac is a village in the municipality of Bosanski Petrovac, Bosnia and Herzegovina.

Demographics 
According to the 2013 census, its population was 16, all Serbs.

References

Populated places in Bosanski Petrovac
Serb communities in the Federation of Bosnia and Herzegovina